Agriculture in Papua New Guinea has more than a 7,000 years old history, and developed out of pre-agricultural plant/food collecting and cultivation traditions of local hunter-gatherers. Currently around 85% of Papua New Guinea's population lives from semi-subsistence agriculture.

Papua New Guinea produces and exports agricultural, timber, and fish products. Agriculture in 2017 accounted for 22.1% of the GDP and supported more than 80% of the population. Cash crops ranked by value are coffee, oil, cocoa, copra, tea, rubber, and sugar. The timber industry was not active in 1998, due to low world prices, but rebounded in 1999. About 40% of the country is covered with timber rich trees, and a domestic woodworking industry has been slow to develop. Fish exports are confined primarily to shrimp, although fishing boats of other nations catch tuna in Papua New Guinea waters under license. Also, Papua New Guinea has the largest yam market in Asia.

History
People in Papua New Guinea started practising forms of plant cultivation and agriculture around 7,000 – 10,000 years ago. The Papuan agricultural tradition independently formed out of the local plant and food collecting traditions of hunter-gatherers. The spread of agricultural techniques may be linked to the Trans–New Guinea speaking groups, which make up roughly half of the Indigenous people of New Guinea, and diverged from other Papuans around 10,000 years ago, based on genetic distance. The oldest evidence for this is in the Kuk Swamp area, where planting, digging and staking of plants, and possibly drainage have been used to cultivate taro, banana, sago and yam. Later, around 4,000 years ago, arriving Austronesian peoples, brought additional techniques. Local Papuan groups borrowed some agricultural-related elements and material culture. Cultural contacts between local Papuan groups and Austronesians is also evident by genetic data. Around 20% of the Papuan genome is derived from admixture with Austronesian seafarers from Taiwan.

Between the 17th and 19th centuries, a small number of plant species, including sweet potato, cassava and tobacco have been brought from the Americas by Europeans and introduced to Indonesia from where they spread to New Guinea. In the second part of the 19th century and especially after 1870 further crops have been introduced directly by Europeans, including beans, pumpkin, corn, watermelon, papaya, mangosteen, durian, orange, lemon, coffee, lime and guava.

Production
Papua New Guinea produced in 2018:

 2.4 million tons of palm oil (9th largest world producer);
 1.3 million tons of banana;
 1.2 million tons of coconut (7th largest world producer);
 1.1 million tons of fruits, fresh nes;
 728 thousand tons of sweet potato (17th largest world producer);
 375 thousand tons of yam;
 356 thousand tons of root and tubers;
 325 thousand tons of vegetable;
 271 thousand tons of taro;
 241 thousand tons of maize (green);
 237 thousand tons of sugar cane;
 152 thousand tons of cassava;
 107 thousand tons of berries nes;
 57 thousand tons of coffee;
 44 thousand tons of cocoa;

In addition to smaller productions of other agricultural products, like natural rubber (7.7 thousand tons) and tea (5.5 thousand tons).

Major agricultural products

Sweet potato
Sweet potato is a major food in PNG and dominates production in the highlands.
It is one of PNG's top five staple foods, taking the top position with 99% of rural New Guineans growing it, followed by banana with 96% and taro with 95%.

Coffee

Coffee production in Papua New Guinea accounts for a little over 1% of the total world production according to the United Nations Conference on Trade and Development (UNCTAD). After oil palm, coffee is Papua New Guinea's second largest agricultural export, employing approximately 2.5 million people.

Copra

Copra has been cultivated in New Guinea since the late 19th century, originally by German colonialists. Production has continued by Australian interests since World War II.

See also

Aquaculture in Papua New Guinea
Economy of Papua New Guinea
Domesticated plants and animals of Austronesia

References